Khaoula Ben Hamza (born 18 May 1991 in Tunis) is a Tunisian taekwondo practitioner. She competed in the +67 kg event at the 2012 Summer Olympics and was eliminated by Anastasia Baryshnikova in the preliminary round.  She also competed at the 2008 Summer Olympics, in the same category, losing to eventual gold medallist Maria Espinoza in the first round.  Because Espinoza reached the final, Ben Hamza was entered into the repechage, where she lost to Karolina Kedzierska.

References

1991 births
Living people
Tunisian female taekwondo practitioners
Olympic taekwondo practitioners of Tunisia
Taekwondo practitioners at the 2008 Summer Olympics
Taekwondo practitioners at the 2012 Summer Olympics
Sportspeople from Tunis
21st-century Tunisian women